Jean Raymond Hippolyte Lazerges (1817–1887) was a French painter, and composer of mélodies and chansons.

Life and career
Lazerges was born in Narbonne, France, where his father was a baker. He studied in Paris under the sculptor David d'Angers and the painter François Bouchot.

He travelled to Algeria with his father in 1830. His paintings often depicted Oriental women engaged in every-day activities such as preparing fleece and working at their primitive looms.

Among his light songs Éloge du tabac has been recorded by Paul Van Nevel's Huelgas Ensemble.

His son Jean-Baptiste Paul Lazerges (1845–1902) was also a painter.

He died in Si-Mustapha, a suburb of Algiers, Algeria.

Gallery

Awards and recognition

He obtained two medals in 1843 and 1848 and was awarded the Legion of Honour in 1867.

See also
 List of Orientalist artists
 Orientalism

References

19th-century French painters
French male painters
French songwriters
Male songwriters
People from Narbonne
1817 births
1887 deaths
19th-century French male artists